Ashraf Siddiqui (1 March 1927 – 19 March 2020) was a Bangladeshi poet, researcher, folklorist, and essayist. He was awarded Bangla Academy Literary Award in 1964 and Ekushey Padak in 1988 by the Government of Bangladesh.

Early life and education
Siddiqui was born in Nagbari village of Tangail. Siddiqui completed his master's from the University of Dhaka in Bengali literature. He earned his Ph.D. in folklore studies from the Indiana University.

Career
Siddiqui served as a faculty member at Rajshahi College, Chittagong College, Ananda Mohan College, Dhaka College, Jagannath College and the University of Dhaka. He served as the director of Kendrio Bangla Unnoyon Board, chief editor of District Gazetteer and director general of Bangla Academy during 1976–1982.

Siddiqui also served as the chairman of Bangladesh Sangbad Sangstha, chairman of Bangladesh Press Institute and president of Nazrul Academy and Nazrul Institute.

Personal life
Siddiqui was married to Syeda Siddiqui from 1951 until her death in 1997. He died at the age of 93 in 2020.

Awards
 Ekushey Padak for literature (1988)
 Bangla Academy Literary Award for children's literature in 1964
 UNESCO Award (1966)
 Daud Award

References

2020 deaths
1927 births
People from Tangail District
Indiana University alumni
University of Dhaka alumni
Academic staff of Dhaka College
Academic staff of the University of Dhaka
Bangladeshi male writers
Recipients of Bangla Academy Award
Recipients of the Ekushey Padak